Robert Fish (26 May 1871 – 1944) was an English footballer who played in the Football League for Darwen.

References

1871 births
1944 deaths
English footballers
Association football midfielders
English Football League players
Darwen F.C. players
Chorley F.C. players